Uriah Hair House is a historic home located at Dundee in Yates County, New York. It is an Italianate style structure built about 1850.

It was listed on the National Register of Historic Places in 1994.

References

Houses on the National Register of Historic Places in New York (state)
Italianate architecture in New York (state)
Houses completed in 1850
Houses in Yates County, New York
National Register of Historic Places in Yates County, New York